Sardis High School is a public high school in Sardis City, Alabama, United States. It is a part of Etowah County Schools.

Athletics 
The following sports are offered at Sardis:

 Baseball
 Basketball
 Cross Country
 Football
 Golf
 Softball
 Volleyball
 Track & Field
 Tennis

References

External links
 

Schools in Etowah County, Alabama
Public high schools in Alabama